Zelenović is a Serbian surname, derived from the word zeleno, meaning "green". Notable people with the surname include:

Dragutin Zelenović (born 1928), Yugoslav and Serbian politician
Nemanja Zelenović (born 1990), Serbian handballer
Nebojša Zelenović (born 1975), Serbian politician

Serbian surnames